Arizona's 13th Legislative District is one of 30 in the state, covering northwest Maricopa County and northern Yuma County. As of 2021, there are 50 precincts in the district, 29 in Maricopa and 21 in Yuma, with a total registered voter population of 166,083. The district has an overall population of 247,927.

Political representation
The district is represented for the 2023-2024 Legislative Session in the State Senate by J.D. Mesnard (R) and in the House of Representatives by Tim Dunn (R) and Jennifer Pawlik (D).

References

Maricopa County, Arizona
Yuma County, Arizona
Arizona legislative districts